The Premios Tu Mundo (Spanish for "Your World Awards") is an annual award presented by American television network Telemundo. The awards celebrates the achievements of Hispanics and Latinos in the media including TV shows, movies, music, fashion, and sports. The awards were established in 2012. Telemundo announced that there would not be a ceremony in 2018, but that the seventh edition would be held in 2019.

Ceremonies

Awards

Current awards

Discontinued awards

References

Awards honoring Hispanic and Latino Americans
Awards established in 2012
Telemundo original programming